Alexander John Millmow is an Australian economic historian, journalist, and author. Formerly an associate professor at Federation University Australia, he is an honorary research fellow at Federation University and at Australian National University, and is president of the History of Economic Thought Society of Australia.

Books 
Millmow is the author of books including:
The Power of Economic Ideas: The Origins of Keynesian Macroeconomic Management in Interwar Australia 1929–39 (Australian National University E Press, 2010)
A History of Australasian Economic Thought (Routledge, 2017)
The Gypsy Economist: The Life and Times of Colin Clark (Palgrave Macmillan, 2021)

He is co-editor of Reclaiming Pluralism in Economics (Routledge, 2016, with Jerry Courvisanos and James Doughney).

References

Australian historians
Living people
Year of birth missing (living people)
Historians of Australia
Economic historians